Balfour is a developing gold mining and maize farming town in Mpumalanga, South Africa.

History
Proclaimed on 16 February 1898, it was renamed Balfour on 15 February 1905, after Arthur James Balfour, Prime Minister of Great Britain, 1902–1905, who visited South Africa in that year.

References

Populated places in the Dipaleseng Local Municipality
Mining communities in South Africa